Hans Ziglarski (Polish: Jan Żyglarski, 16 October 1905 in Białystok, Russian Empire – 12 February 1975) was a Polish-German boxer who competed in the 1928 Summer Olympics and in the 1932 Summer Olympics.

In 1928 he lost his first fight against Vince Glionna and was eliminated in the first round of the bantamweight competition.

Four years later he won the silver medal in the bantamweight class after losing the final against Horace Gwynne.

After World War II, Ziglarski went to Tehran and coached the Iranian boxer Emmanuel Agassi, the father of tennis player Andre Agassi.

Olympic results 
1928 competed at the Amsterdam Olympics at Bantamweight. Result was:
Lost to Vince Glionna (Canada) PTS
1932 won the Bantamweight silver medal at the Los Angeles Olympics. Results were:
Quarterfinal: Defeated Paul Nicolas (France) PTS
Semifinal: Defeated Joseph Lang (United States) PTS
Final: Lost to Horace Gwynne (Canada) PTS

References
 profile
 Image from the final 1932/Ziglarski right

1905 births
1975 deaths
Sportspeople from Białystok
People from Belostoksky Uyezd
Polish emigrants to Germany
Bantamweight boxers
Olympic boxers of Germany
Boxers at the 1928 Summer Olympics
Boxers at the 1932 Summer Olympics
Olympic silver medalists for Germany
Olympic medalists in boxing
Medalists at the 1932 Summer Olympics
German male boxers